The following is a list of the mayors of Phoenix, Arizona.

External links 

 Political Graveyard: Mayors of Phoenix

Phoenix